Eskaton is a defunct vanity record label created by Coil, exclusively for albums put out by the group and their friends. Its brother labels are Threshold House and Chalice.

The record label is often associated with the symbol of the "Chaos Cross" and the "Twisted Chaos Cross", symbols which have appeared on several Eskaton releases, such as Gold Is The Metal with the Broadest Shoulders.

Releases

Chaos Cross
The symbol of the chaos cross was used almost exclusively in the times of Coil's side projects. It is a dominant symbol which can be found on a number of releases and merchandise.

See also
 List of record labels
 List of electronic music record labels

External links
 Threshold House
 Chaos Cross on Above Air artwork

British record labels
Record labels established in 1994
Record labels disestablished in 2006
Experimental music record labels
Vanity record labels